The Jamaican International Championships was a mens international tennis tournament founded in 1924 and played on outdoor hard courts at the Liguanea Club, Kingston, Jamaica. The championships were held until 1939.

History
The Jamaican International Championships was a mens international tennis tournament founded in 1924 and played on outdoor hard courts at the Liguanea Club, Kingston, Jamaica. In 1938 the tournament was moved to Unifruit Company Club for one edition only.  The championships were held until 1939 when they were discontinued due to World War II. The championships were a stop on the Caribbean Tennis Circuit, that was a winter leg of the ILTF Circuit from the 1920s to the 1970s.  Kingston International Championships

Finals

Men's Singles
(incomplete roll)

References

Hard court tennis tournaments
Defunct tennis tournaments in Jamaica